Vladimír Slamka (born December 2, 1966 in Zvolen) is a Slovak sport shooter. He competed at the 1996 Summer Olympics in the men's trap event, in which he placed sixth, and the men's double trap event, in which he tied for 25th place.

References

1966 births
Living people
Trap and double trap shooters
Slovak male sport shooters
Shooters at the 1996 Summer Olympics
Olympic shooters of Slovakia
Sportspeople from Zvolen